Prestatyn Chapel Street railway station was the first stop on the Dyserth branch line (now a footpath). It was the only station on the line to have a level crossing. It is also unique because pieces of track have been built into the ground as a feature of historical interest. The platform and signs have long gone, but a remaining piece of railing would have been there to separate the road and the railway.

The branch line to Dyserth was opened by the LNWR in 1869, initially for mineral traffic only. A passenger service was instituted in 1905 but lasted only until 1930, when it was withdrawn by the LMS. The line remained open to serve a quarry at Dyserth until complete closure in 1973.

References

Sources

Disused railway stations in Denbighshire
Prestatyn
Former London and North Western Railway stations
Railway stations in Great Britain opened in 1906
Railway stations in Great Britain closed in 1930